Santa Lucía Cotzumalguapa is a town, with a population of 58,877 (2018 census), and a municipality in the Escuintla department of Guatemala.

The municipality includes the Cotzumalhuapa archaeological zone, including the pre-Columbian archaeological sites of El Baúl and Bilbao. It is the birthplace of president Carlos Castillo Armas.

Climate

Santa Lucía Cotzumalguapa has a tropical monsoon climate (Köppen: Am).

Sports 
The town has a team that plays in the Liga Nacional de Guatemala, the top division soccer league in Guatemala.

See also

 Carlos Herrera y Luna

Notes and references

Municipalities of the Escuintla Department